Charles Newby (born 18 June 1941) is a British musician who was briefly the bassist for the Beatles for several gigs in December 1960, while Stuart Sutcliffe was still in Hamburg focusing on his art career.

Career 
When the Beatles returned from West Germany for the first time, they were short of a bass guitarist. Pete Best suggested Chas Newby. Newby had been with The Black Jacks (Best's group), and was now attending university; however, he was on holiday, and so he agreed to play with the Beatles.

Newby appeared with the Beatles for four engagements in December 1960 (17 December, Casbah Club, Liverpool; 24 December, Grosvenor Ballroom, Liscard; 27 December, Litherland Town Hall; 31 December, Casbah Club). John Lennon asked him to go to West Germany for the Beatles' second trip, but Newby chose to return to university. After Lennon and George Harrison both declined to switch to bass guitar, Paul McCartney, who previously played guitar and piano, reluctantly became the band's bassist.

Personal life
Newby taught mathematics at Droitwich Spa High School in Droitwich Spa and now lives in Alcester, where he plays in a charity group, the Racketts. Since 2016, Newby has been performing as a member of the Quarrymen, the band that was the precursor to the Beatles.

References

1941 births
Living people
English rock bass guitarists
Male bass guitarists
People from Blackpool
The Beatles members